Stan Lee's Mutants, Monsters & Marvels is a 2002 American documentary film produced by Creative Light Entertainment consisting of an interview of Marvel Comics publisher Stan Lee by film director Kevin Smith. The two talk about Lee's life, his marriage with Joan Lee, the 2002 Spider-Man film, and Spider-Man comics. Lee refers to Marvel Comics character J. Jonah Jameson as "the version so many people had of me." The interview was filmed in February 2002 in Santa Monica, California at a comic book store. The result was a nearly two-hour-long film. The documentary was included in a four-disc release of the 2002 Spider-Man film.

References

External links

2002 direct-to-video films
2002 documentary films
2002 films
American documentary films
Autobiographical documentary films
American autobiographies
Stan Lee
Documentary films about comics
Documentary films about films
Documentary films about writers
2000s English-language films
2000s American films